Total Access Recording is a recording studio located in Redondo Beach, California, owned and operated by founder Wyn Davis and Steve Ornest. Total Access opened for business in December 1980. The first clients of the studio were bands signed with SST Records, whose owner Greg Ginn had made a "bulk recording deal" with Davis. Renowned producer Ken Scott is also a client of the studio.

Notable clients
 Black Flag
 The Descendents
 Colleen D'Agostino
 Dio
 Dokken
 Foreigner
 Gastunk
 Great White
 Guns N' Roses
 Heaven & Hell
 Hüsker Dü
 Iglesia Indica
 Long Beach Dub Allstars
 Minutemen
 No Doubt
 Pennywise
 Pepper
 Saint Vitus
 Slightly Stoopid
 SNEW
 Sublime
 Unwritten Law

References

External links 
 tarecording.com
Facebook

Recording studios in California
Redondo Beach, California
1980 establishments in California